HMS Sikh was a  destroyer of the British Royal Navy. The ship entered service in 1938 and served during the Second World War, participating in the sinking of Bismarck and the Battle of Cape Bon. In 1942, while participating in a commando raid, Sikh was sunk by a combination of shore artillery, anti-aircraft guns and aerial bombs.

Description
The Tribals were intended to counter the large destroyers being built abroad and to improve the firepower of the existing destroyer flotillas and were thus significantly larger and more heavily armed than the preceding . The destroyers were powered by two Parsons geared steam turbines, each driving one propeller shaft using steam provided by three Admiralty three-drum boilers. The ships' complement consisted of 190 officers and ratings, although the flotilla leaders carried an extra 20 officers and men consisting of the Captain (D) and his staff.

The primary armament of the Tribal-class destroyers was eight quick-firing (QF) 4.7-inch (120 mm) Mark XII guns in four superfiring twin-gun mounts, one pair each fore and aft of the superstructure, designated 'A', 'B', 'X', and 'Y' from front to rear. The mounts had a maximum elevation of 40°. For anti-aircraft (AA) defence, they carried a single quadruple mount for the  QF two-pounder Mk II "pom-pom" gun and two quadruple mounts for the 0.5-inch (12.7 mm) Mark III machine gun. Low-angle fire for the main guns was controlled by the director-control tower (DCT) on the bridge roof that fed data acquired by it and the  rangefinder on the Mk II Rangefinder/Director directly aft of the DCT to an analogue mechanical computer, the Mk I Admiralty Fire Control Clock. Anti-aircraft fire for the main guns was controlled by the Rangefinder/Director which sent data to the mechanical Fuze Keeping Clock.

The ships were fitted with a single above-water quadruple mount for  torpedoes. The Tribals were not intended as anti-submarine ships, but they were provided with ASDIC, one depth charge rack and two throwers for self-defence, although the throwers were not mounted in all ships; Twenty depth charges was the peacetime allotment, but this increased to 30 during wartime.

Wartime modifications
Heavy losses to German air attack during the Norwegian Campaign demonstrated the ineffectiveness of the Tribals' anti-aircraft suite and the RN decided in May 1940 to replace 'X' mount with two QF  Mark XVI dual-purpose guns in a twin-gun mount. To better control the guns, the existing rangefinder/director was modified to accept a Type 285 gunnery radar as they became available. The number of depth charges was increased to 46 early in the war, and still more were added later. To increase the firing arcs of the AA guns, the rear funnel was shortened and the mainmast was reduced to a short pole mast.

Construction and career 
Authorized as one of nine Tribal-class destroyers under the 1936 Naval Estimates, Sikh was the second ship of her name to serve in the Royal Navy. The ship was ordered on 19 June 1936 from Alexander Stephen and Sons and was laid down on 24 September at the company's Linthouse shipyard. Launched on 8 June 1937, Sikh was commissioned on 12 October 1938 at a cost of £337,704 which excluded weapons and communications outfits furnished by the Admiralty. The ship entered service as part of the 4th Destroyer Flotilla of the Royal Navy.

In 1941, while under the command of Commander Stokes, she took part in the sinking of the German battleship . The night before Bismarck was sunk, she fired a salvo of four torpedoes and claimed a hit after hearing underwater explosions, but actually there were no hits.

On 14 September, Sikh and Zulu landed and then covered Operation Agreement, a commando raid on Tobruk. Sikh was hit repeatedly, apparently principally by 152 mm, 145 mm and 120 mm Italian coastal artillery (though British sources sometimes attribute the fire entirely to German 88 mm guns), and may have also been bombed by a Macchi C.200, and hit by scuttling fire from HMS Croome  – 115 men were lost and many more were taken prisoner, the majority of them when the Royal Marine landing craft that had rescued them was captured by an Italian MZ lighter. Zulu was damaged and sunk by aerial bombing the following day.

References

Sources 
 
 
 
 
 
  
 
 

Further reading
  
 
 

 

Tribal-class destroyers (1936) of the Royal Navy
Ships built on the River Clyde
1937 ships
World War II destroyers of the United Kingdom
World War II shipwrecks in the Mediterranean Sea
Maritime incidents in September 1942
Ships sunk by Italian aircraft
Destroyers sunk by aircraft
Ships sunk by coastal artillery